The Crackerjack is a 1925 American silent comedy film directed by Charles Hines and starring Johnny Hines, Sigrid Holmquist, and Henry West.

A travelling pickle salesman gets mixed up in a Latin American revolution.

Plot
As described in a film magazine review, Tommy Perkins meets and falls in love with Rose Bannon, daughter of General Bannon. The general is in New York City with the revolutionist Alonzo López, who plans to overthrow the government of Esquasado. Perkins is called to the South by his uncle who wishes him to take over a pickle factory that is on its last legs. He applies crackerjack methods to build up the business, and runs into Rose while going about his work. When he learns of a plot to overthrow the South American government, he aids in frustrating those plans. The pickle business blooms and he marries Rose.

Cast
 Johnny Hines as Tommy Perkins 
 Sigrid Holmquist as Rose Bannon 
 Henry West as Gen. Bannon 
 Bradley Barker as Alonzo López 
 J. Barney Sherry as Col. Perkins

References

Bibliography
 Munden, Kenneth White. The American Film Institute Catalog of Motion Pictures Produced in the United States, Part 1. University of California Press, 1997.

External links

1925 films
1926 comedy films
1926 films
Silent American comedy films
Films directed by Charles Hines
American silent feature films
1920s English-language films
American black-and-white films
1925 comedy films
1920s American films